Fazaia Schools and Colleges is a system of schools in Pakistan affiliated with the FBISE or Federal Board of Pakistan. Its headquarters are in E-9, Islamabad.The schools are operated by the Pakistan Air Force which operates a total of 27 of these schools and colleges.These include:

See also
Pakistan Air Force

References

External links 
 PAF Schools & Colleges

School systems in Pakistan
Pakistan Air Force education and training
Military schools in Pakistan